Swiss World Airways was a short-lived Swiss airline headquartered in Geneva and operating out of Geneva Airport.

History
It was founded in 1997 with the aim of operating on routes abandoned by Swissair, but closed in 1998 for financial reasons. An attempt to save it failed.

Destinations
Swiss World Airways only operated scheduled flights from Geneva to Newark Liberty International Airport with flights to Montreal and Miami announced as being planned.

Fleet

The airline had one aircraft, a Boeing 767-200ER on lease from Ansett Australia.

References

External links 
 Archived homepage

Defunct airlines of Switzerland
Airlines established in 1997
Airlines disestablished in 1998
Swiss companies disestablished in 1998
Swiss companies established in 1997